Dreams of the Red Wizards is an accessory for the Advanced Dungeons & Dragons fantasy role-playing game. Dreams of the Red Wizards: Dead in Thay is a module for Dungeons & Dragons Next/5th ed.

Contents
Dreams of the Red Wizards is a supplement that focuses on a nation ruled by evil wizards.

Publication history
FR6 Dreams of the Red Wizards was written by Steve Perrin, with a cover by Clyde Caldwell, and was published by TSR in 1988 as a 64-page book with a large color map and an outer folder. The name can be a reference to the Chinese classic novel Dream of the Red Chamber.

Reception

Reviews

Dreams of the Red Wizards: Dead in Thay
In 2014, Scott Fitzgerald Gray designed a megadungeon for D&D Next/ 5th edition, named Dreams of the Red Wizards: Dead in Thay. It was designed to be a dynamic dungeon-crawl for episodic play. An «Event Coordinator managed the interactions of multiple groups of players, all playing the same adventure.»

References
 

Forgotten Realms sourcebooks
Role-playing game supplements introduced in 1988